"Jump for Joy" is a 1996 song recorded by Belgian/Dutch Eurodance band 2 Unlimited, released as the second single from their greatest hits compilation album, Hits Unlimited. It was a Top 10 hit in the Netherlands and Spain.

Chart performance
"Jump for Joy" scored chart success in several European countries, reaching the Top 10 in the Netherlands and Spain, peaking at number seven and number four. Additionally, it reached the Top 20 in Belgium, as well as on the Eurochart Hot 100, where this was the last 2 Unlimited song to peak at number 13, it also reached at number 18 on the MTV European Top 20 for 1 week and number 13 on MTV Europe. It also made it to the Top 40 in Sweden and Germany. "Jump for Joy" did not obtain a UK release, unlike the previous single "Do What's Good for Me". Outside Europe, it peaked at number 22 on the RPM dance chart in Canada and number 137 in Australia.

Music video
The accompanying music video for "Jump for Joy" was directed by directors Max Giwa and Dania Pasquini, known as just Max & Dania. It was shot in January 1996. The song was the last single that 2 Unlimited in their Anita and Ray guise released with a proper video before their break up at the end of 1996. The video was later published on 2 Unlimited's official YouTube channel in December 2013. It has amassed more than 1,3 million views as of September 2021.

Track listing

 CD single, France & Benelux
 "Jump for Joy" (Edit) (3:42)
 "Jump for Joy" (Digidance Happy Hardcore Edit) (3:19)

 CD maxi, France "Jump for Joy" (Edit) (3:42)
 "Jump for Joy" (Digidance Happy Hardcore Edit) (3:19)
 "Jump for Joy" (Armand's Dutch Touch Mix) (7:51)
 "MTV Partyzone Megamix" (4:55)

 CD maxi "Jump for Joy" (Edit) (3:42)
 "Jump for Joy" (Digidance Happy Hardcore Edit) (3:19)
 "Jump for Joy" (Armand's Dutch Touch Mix) (7:51)
 "Jump for Joy" (Itty-Bitty-Boozy-Woozy's Dub For Joy) (5:25)
 "MTV Partyzone Megamix" (4:55)

 Cassette, Australia & New Zealand
 "Jump for Joy" (Edit) (3:42)
 "Jump for Joy" (Digidance Happy Hardcore Edit) (3:19)
 "Jump for Joy" (Armand's Dutch Touch Mix) (7:51)
 "Jump for Joy" (Itty-Bitty-Boozy-Woozy's Dub For Joy) (5:25)
 "MTV Partyzone Megamix" (4:55)

 7" single, Germany
 "Jump for Joy" (Radio Edit) (3:42)
 "Jump for Joy" (Digidance Happy Hardcore Edit) (3:19)

 12" maxi, Germany
 "Jump for Joy" (Digidance Happy Hardcore Edit) (3:19)
 "Jump for Joy" (Armand's Dutch Touch Mix) (7:51)
 "Jump for Joy" (Itty-Bitty-Boozy-Woozy's Dub For Joy) (5:25)
 "MTV Partyzone Megamix" (4:55)

 12" maxi, Greece
 "Jump for Joy" (Edit) (3:42)
 "Jump for Joy" (Digidance Happy Hardcore Edit) (3:19)
 "Jump for Joy" (Armand's Dutch Touch Mix) (7:51)
 "Jump for Joy" (Itty-Bitty-Boozy-Woozy's Dub For Joy) (5:25)

 12" maxi, France
 "Jump for Joy" (Digidance Happy Hardcore Mix) (5:47)
 "Jump for Joy" (Armand's Dutch Touch Mix) (7:51)
 "Jump for Joy" (Itty-Bitty-Boozy-Woozy's Dub 4 Joy) (5:25)
 "Jump for Joy" (Edit) (3:42)

 12" Vinyl, Benelux & Spain
 "Jump for Joy" (Digidance Happy Hardcore Mix) (5:47)
 "Jump for Joy" (Edit) (3:42)
 "Jump for Joy" (Armand's Dutch Touch Mix) (7:51)
 "Jump for Joy" (Itty-Bitty-Boozy-Woozy's Dub 4 Joy) (5:25)

 12" Vinyl, Italy
 "Jump for Joy" (Digidance Happy Hardcore Mix) (5:47)
 "Jump for Joy" (Edit) (3:42)
 "Jump for Joy" (Digidance Happy Hardcore Edit) (3:19)
 "Jump for Joy" (Armand's Dutch Touch Mix) (7:51)
 "Jump for Joy" (Itty-Bitty-Boozy-Woozy's Dub For Joy) (5:25)
 "MTV Partyzone Megamix" (4:55)

 12" Vinyl, Canada
 "Jump for Joy" (Armand's Dutch Touch Mix) (7:51)
 "Jump for Joy" (Original Edit) (3:42)
 "Jump for Joy" (Itty-Bitty-Boozy-Woozy's Dub For Joy) (5:25)
 "Jump for Joy" (Digidance Happy Hardcore Edit) (3:19)
 "MTV Partyzone Megamix" (4:55)

Charts

Weekly charts

Year-end charts

References

1995 singles
2 Unlimited songs
1995 songs
Songs about dancing
Songs written by Phil Wilde
Songs written by Ray Slijngaard
Songs written by Anita Doth
Byte Records singles
ZYX Music singles
Music videos directed by Max & Dania